The 1998–99 Short Track Speed Skating World Cup was a multi-race tournament in short track speed skating. The season began on 25 September 1998 and ended on 6 December 1998.

Men

Events

World Cup Rankings

Women

Events

World Cup Rankings

Podium summary

References 
Results

ISU Short Track Speed Skating World Cup
World Cup
World Cup